Gary Matthew Fellows (born 30 July 1978,) is a former first-class cricketer, who played for Yorkshire County Cricket Club.

Fellows played as a right-handed batsman and right arm medium pace bowler, who played regularly for Yorkshire from 1998 to 2003 in first-class cricket, and into 2005 in the one day game.  A bustling, busy player he scored 1,592 runs at 23.41, with a highest score of 109, and he took 32 wickets at 38.37, with a best of 3 for 23.  He played 96 List A one day matches for the Tykes, scoring 1,350 runs at 20.76, with a top of 80 not out,  and taking 23 wickets at just over 37.

He began his cricket at the Illingworth C.C. in the Airedale-Wharfedale Senior Cricket League and played Minor Counties Championship cricket for Shropshire.

He now plays where he started his cricket journey at Illingworth St. Mary's in the Halifax cricket league.

References

External links

1978 births
Living people
English cricketers
Yorkshire cricketers
Cricketers from Halifax, West Yorkshire
Matabeleland cricketers
Shropshire cricketers